Yasnaya Polyana is a rural locality (a settlement) in Beloglazovsky Selsoviet, Shipunovsky District, Altai Krai, Russia. The population was 326 as of 2013. There are 6 streets.

Geography 
Yasnaya Polyana is located 29 km southeast of Shipunovo (the district's administrative centre) by road. Beloglazovo is the nearest rural locality.

References 

Rural localities in Shipunovsky District